Alexander Wittek (12 October 1852, Sisak – 11 May 1894, Graz) was an Austrian-Hungarian architect and chess master.

As an architect, Wittek worked in Bosnia and Herzegovina during Austro-Hungarian Empire. His most well-known works in Sarajevo are the City Hall building called "Vijećnica" (1892–1894) which later became the National Library and the Sebilj public fountain (1891), both of which were built in the pseudo-Moorish style.

Wittek was also a chess master. He tied for 5–6th at Berlin 1881 (2nd DSB–Congress, Joseph Henry Blackburne won), and was in 9th place at Vienna 1882 (Wilhelm Steinitz and Simon Winawer won). In 1882 he was ranked 9th in the world.

Wittek died in a lunatic asylum in Graz in 1894, having been diagnosed with a "paralytic mental disorder" the previous year. One source says that he committed suicide but another cites tuberculosis.

See also

 František Blažek
 Josip Vancaš
 Karel Pařík
 Juraj Neidhardt

References

External links
 Alexander Wittek games of chess

1852 births
1894 deaths
19th-century architects
19th-century chess players
People from Sisak
Austrian architects
Austrian chess players
Bosnia and Herzegovina architects
Croatian chess players
Suicides in Austria
1890s suicides